Charlotte Christian School is a private, college preparatory, non-denominational Christian school for grades K–12. It is located in Charlotte, North Carolina.

History
In 1950, D.L. Pointdexter McClenny began a ministry at Calvary Presbyterian Church in uptown Charlotte called Calvary Christian Day School for kindergarten to grade six. In 1960, a group of men inspired by a Billy Graham crusade organized Christian High School. In 1969, these two schools merged to become Christian School Association of Charlotte, Inc., creating a kindergarten through twelfth grade institution. The school continued to grow and moved to its current site on Sardis Rd. in 1971. In 1976 the school was renamed Charlotte Christian School.

Academics 
Charlotte Christian offers more than 45 Advanced Placement and honors courses. In the National Merit Scholarship Competition (NMSC), Charlotte Christian had 11 awards recipients

Fine arts 
The Center for Worship and Performing Arts is at the center of the fine arts program on campus. This two-story building contains an auditorium, a black-box theater, a scene shop and dressing rooms for student performers. There is also space for visual arts students to display their work. The center hosts plays, concerts, chapels, assemblies and other large events.

The performing arts program has received 24 Wells Fargo Blumey Award nominations for upper school musicals since the award began in 2012, and it has won five. Theatre students also have won honors at the Wingate Shakespeare Festival, the North Carolina Theatre Competition and Christians in Theatre Arts competitions.

Athletics 
Charlotte Christian competes in the 4-A division of the North Carolina Independent Schools Athletic Association (NCISAA) and the Charlotte Independent Schools Athletic Association (CISAA) conference.

The varsity baseball team has won fifteen NCISAA state championship titles: 1991, 1999, 2000, 2002, 2003, 2004, 2005, 2006, 2007, 2009, 2012, 2013, 2014, 2015, and 2019.

Charlotte Christian's Varsity Football team has been noted for the four former professional players on its coaching staff and for its high percentage of graduating seniors that play in college. The team has won seven NCISAA state titles: 1992, 2008, 2012, 2013, 2014, 2017, and 2018. In 2018 they were named the number one overall team in the Charlotte area by WBTV and by The Charlotte Observer's Sweet 16 Poll (the second private school to win the poll in its history).

Charlotte Christian's Men's Varsity Basketball team has won three NCISAA state titles: 1992, 1997, and 2001. Charlotte Christian's Ladies' Varsity Basketball team has won five NCISAA state titles: 1999, 2001, 2002, 2003, 2004.

Charlotte Christian's Ladies' Cross Country team has won three NCISAA state titles: 1990, 1991, 1993.

Charlotte Christian's Men's Track & Field team won an NCISAA state title in 2001, and the Ladies' Track and Field Team won state titles in 2001 and 2002.

Notable alumni
 Daniel Bard, MLB pitcher
 Luke Bard, MLB pitcher
 Garrett Bradbury, NFL center, drafted in the first round to the Minnesota Vikings
Seth Curry, NBA player
 Stephen Curry, NBA player, 4x NBA champion and 2x NBA MVP
 Matthias Farley, NFL safety
 Todd Fuller, NBA player
 Anthony Gill, professional basketball player
Derek Halvorson, president, Covenant College
 Bo Hines, college football player and politician
 Clint Irwin, MLS goalkeeper
 Jackson Kowar, baseball pitcher in the Kansas City Royals organization
 Desmond Lawrence, Canadian Football League (CFL) defensive back
 Akil Mitchell, professional basketball player
 Jared Odenbeck, professional soccer player
 Ollie Sturluson, professional basketball player
 Jeremy Thompson, NFL defensive end
 Orrin Thompson, NFL and CFL offensive tackle

References

External links
 

1950 establishments in North Carolina
Christian schools in North Carolina
Educational institutions established in 1950
Preparatory schools in North Carolina
Private elementary schools in North Carolina
Private middle schools in North Carolina
Private high schools in North Carolina
Schools in Charlotte, North Carolina